Thorsten Kirschbaum (born 20 April 1987) is a German professional footballer who plays as a goalkeeper for 2. Bundesliga club SSV Jahn Regensburg.

Club career
Kirschbaum was a member of the team of 1899 Hoffenheim that won promotion to the 2. Bundesliga. On 10 January 2009, he moved from 1899 Hoffenheim to Liechtenstein to play for FC Vaduz of the Swiss Super League and was released on 30 June 2009. After one year he left SV Sandhausen and signed a three-year contract for Energie Cottbus.

After the end of his contract with Cottbus on 1 July 2013, Kirschbaum moved to VfB Stuttgart on a free transfer. On 10 March 2013, Thorsten Kirschbaum signed a contract until June 2016 with VfB Stuttgart.

On 1 July 2015, Kirschbaum moved to 1. FC Nürnberg.

On 27 May 2019, Kirschbaum joined VVV-Venlo on a free transfer.

In summer 2021, he moved to SSV Jahn Regensburg.

International career
Kirschbaum has made seven appearances for the Germany U-21.

Career statistics

Honours
Individual
 Eredivisie Player of the Month: February 2020

References

External links
 

1987 births
Living people
Sportspeople from Würzburg
German footballers
Germany under-21 international footballers
Germany youth international footballers
Association football goalkeepers
Bundesliga players
2. Bundesliga players
3. Liga players
Regionalliga players
Swiss Super League players
Eredivisie players
TSG 1899 Hoffenheim players
TSG 1899 Hoffenheim II players
FC Vaduz players
SV Sandhausen players
FC Energie Cottbus players
VfB Stuttgart players
1. FC Nürnberg players
Bayer 04 Leverkusen players
VVV-Venlo players
SSV Jahn Regensburg players
Expatriate footballers in Liechtenstein
Expatriate footballers in the Netherlands
German expatriate footballers
German expatriate sportspeople in Liechtenstein
Footballers from Bavaria